Netwrix is a Frisco, Texas-based private IT security software company that develops software to help companies identify and secure sensitive data and assist with compliance auditing. After eight acquisitions the company's team geographically expanded to Latin America, UK, Germany, France, Asia, USA as well as other countries. The company's flagship products are Netwrix Auditor and StealthAUDIT that help information security and governance professionals manage sensitive, regulated and business-critical data.

The company operates in the United States, EMEA and Asia Pacific region.

History
Netwrix was founded by Mike Walters and Alex Vovk in 2006.

In 2007, Netwrix released its first product, change auditing software for Active Directory. This software was subsequently folded into the company’s Change Reporter Suite, which was later renamed Netwrix Auditor.

In 2011, Netwrix released its SCOM Management Pack for Change Reporter Suite, which integrates Netwrix’s auditing solutions with Microsoft System Center.

The company released a new version of Active Directory Change Reporter in November 2012.

In June 2013, the company renamed its flagship product, Netwrix Change Reporter, Netwrix Auditor.

On 7 February 2017 Netwrix secured Series A financing from Washington, DC-based Updata Partners.

On 5 April 2018 Steve Dickson was appointed as Chief Executive Officer by the company's Board of Directors. Steve Dickson replaced Mike Walters, previous CEO and co-founder and Alex Vovk, President and co-founder.

On 28 November 2018 Netwrix acquired Concept Searching Limited.

In August 2019, Netwrix formed a strategic partnership with Mott MacDonald, a UK-based consultancy, to offer data classification technology to clients.

In October 2020, Netwrix received a majority investment from TA Associates.

On 4 January 2021 Netwrix merged with Stealthbits Technologies Inc. Stealthbits provided data security and privacy solutions.

In February 2021, Netwrix acquired Strongpoint, a compliance, change management, and access management solution for Salesforce and NetSuite.

On 16 June 2021, Netwrix acquired New Net Technologies (NNT), provider of software for change, configuration, vulnerability and asset management.

On 24 March 2021, Netwrix acquired ANIXIS, a provider of software to enforce password policies.

Netwrix acquired PolicyPak in October 2021. PolicyPak delivered security software to manage on-prem and remote Windows 10 desktops.

In August 2022, Netwrix acquired USERCUBE, a France-based software developer of identity governance and administration solutions.

In September 2022, Netwrix acquired MATESO, a software manufacturer based in Germany that develops an enterprise password management solution.

In November, 2022, Netwrix acquired IMANAMI, US based software company that specializes in Identity and Access management solutions for Microsoft on-prem and cloud based active directory.

Products
The current Netwrix portfolio includes 13 products aimed at securing data, identities and infrastructure. 

The company’s flagship product is Netwrix Auditor, formerly known as Change Reporter Suite. Netwrix Auditor delivers a single console for analysis, alerting and reporting on IT infrastructure changes. It helps organizations track changes and access events across the IT environment, e.g. modifications in security configurations, systems, permissions and data, and provides information as a set of reports. Netwrix Auditor claims to solve security, compliance and operational problems, e.g. it claims to mitigate risk of security breaches, reduce compliance costs and increase the efficiency of IT operations.

In 2014 Netwrix introduced the special edition of Netwrix Auditor for five compliance standards (PCI DSS, HIPAA, FISMA, SOX, GLBA). This edition involved scalability and reporting capabilities, as well as AuditArchive storage that can hold audit data for upward of 10 years.

On 6 August 2019, Netwrix announced Netwrix Data Classification which uses technology from Concept Searching. The product claims to identify sensitive information and reduce its exposure by automatically tagging it with metadata.

In March 2020, Netwrix released an updated version of Data Classification 5.5.2 for Google Drive, enhancement of Microsoft Information Protection (MIP), and CCPA Classification Rules Predefined.

Following the acquisition of Stealthbits in 2021, Netwrix added to its portfolio 4 more products: Netwrix StealthAUDIT, Netwrix SbPAM, Netwrix StealthDEFEND, and Netwrix Stealth INTERCEPT.

Netwrix StealthAUDIT is an audit and reporting platform designed to automate and simplify data security governance. In November 2021, Netwrix StealthAUDIT 11.5 was released to extend data discovery and permissions reporting to cloud databases and Microsoft 365.  
 
Netwrix SbPAM is a product that helps eliminate standing privileged accounts to minimize an organization’s attack surface. In December 2021, Netwrix SbPAM 3.5 was released to cover Azure AD, Cisco network devices and wed interfaces. It also extended support for Linux.

Netwrix StealthINTERCEPT is a password policy enforcement and threat protection product for enterprises. 

Netwrix Change Tracker (formerly NNT Change Tracker) identifies unauthorized configuration changes in an environment.

Netwrix PolicyPak (formerly PolicyPak) protects users from installing unknown software and validates that Group Policy settings are deployed correctly.

Netwrix Password Policy Enforcer enables businesses to implement and manage password policies for Active Directory across user and admin accounts.

Partnerships
Netwrix is a partner of Microsoft, VMware, EMC,NetApp and HP ArcSight.

References

Companies based in Frisco, Texas
Software companies of the United States